Zethes is a genus of moths in the family Erebidae first described by Rambur in 1833.

Description
Palpi thickly scaled, where the second joint obliquely upturned to above vertex of head. Third joint usually long. Thorax and abdomen usually smoothly scaled. Tibia moderately hairy. Forewings with acute apex. Outer margin more or less angled at middle. Hindwings with vein 5 from below middle of discocellulars.

Species
 Zethes brandti Janzon, 1977
 Zethes humilis Mabille, 1900 (from Madagascar)
 Zethes insularis Rambur, 1833 (Mediterranean, Near East, Armenia)
 Zethes monotonus Wiltshire, 1938
 Zethes narghisa Brandt, 1938
 Zethes nemea Brandt, 1938
 Zethes pistazina Weisert, 2001
 Zethes propinquus Christoph, 1885
 Zethes sagittula (von Heyden, 1891) (from Madagascar)

References

Ophiusini
Moth genera